Robin Brooks (born 1961 in Leeds) is a British radio dramatist, some-time actor and author.

Selected credits

Adaptations
 2000 – The Art of Love, a comedy, emphasizing Ovid's role as lover, with Bill Nighy and Anne-Marie Duff
 2004 – Mort by Terry Pratchett
 2006 – Small Gods by Terry Pratchett
 2008 – An Expert in Murder by Nicola Upson
 2008 – Night Watch by Terry Pratchett
 2009 – Armadale by Wilkie Collins
 2010 – I, Claudius by Robert Graves
 2012 – Ulysses by James Joyce
 2012 – Mary Stuart by Friedrich Schiller
 2013 – Eric by Terry Pratchett
 2013 – "Jill" by Philip Larkin
 2019 — One Day in the Life of Ivan Denisovich by Aleksandr Solzhenitsyn

Plays
 1998 – The Golden Triangle – a trilogy on the lives of the Pre-Raphaelite Brotherhood, consisting of:
 The Awakening Conscience (on William Holman Hunt and his model Annie Miller, taking its title from Hunt's painting of the same name)
 The Order of Release (on John Everett Millais, John Ruskin and Effie Gray, named after Millais's painting of the same name)
 Love Among The Ruins (on Edward Burne-Jones and Maria Zambaco, named after Burne-Jones's painting of the same name)
 2003 – The Smallest Man in Christendom
 2006 – Duce's Bonce
 2007 – A Warning to the Furious
 2018 – 4/4: Introduction and Allegro
 2018 – 4/4: Rondo Mysterioso
 2020 – Elizabeth and Essex

References and notes

External Sources

Robin Brooks

English radio writers
Living people
British radio people
1961 births
Writers from Leeds
English dramatists and playwrights
Pre-Raphaelite Brotherhood in popular culture
People from Macclesfield